Jenny Mathilda af Forselles (27 May 1869, Elimäki – 16 September 1938, Helsinki) was a Finnish secondary school teacher and politician. She was a member of the Parliament of Finland from 1909 to 1910 and again from 1911 to 1917, representing the Swedish People's Party of Finland (SFP).

References

External links 

 Jenny af Forselles in 375 humanists. Faculty of Arts, University of Helsinki. 21 July 2015

1869 births
1938 deaths
People from Elimäki
People from Uusimaa Province (Grand Duchy of Finland)
Swedish People's Party of Finland politicians
Members of the Parliament of Finland (1909–10)
Members of the Parliament of Finland (1911–13)
Members of the Parliament of Finland (1913–16)
Members of the Parliament of Finland (1916–17)
Women members of the Parliament of Finland